Events from the year 1996 in the United Kingdom.

This year is noted for the Dunblane Massacre, the divorces of the Duke and Duchess of York (Andrew and Sarah) and of the Prince and Princess of Wales (Charles and Diana) and the birth of Dolly the sheep.

Incumbents
 Monarch – Elizabeth II
 Prime Minister – John Major (Conservative)
 Parliament – 51st

Events

January
 10 January – Terry Venables announces that he will resign as manager of the England national football team after this summer's European Championships, which will be hosted in England.
 13 January – NUM leader Arthur Scargill announces that he is defecting from the Labour Party to set up his own Socialist Labour Party.
 19 January
 The first MORI poll of 1996 shows Labour still comfortably ahead of the Conservatives with a showing of 55% and a lead of 26 points.
 Ian and Kevin Maxwell, sons of the late media mogul Robert Maxwell, are cleared of fraud at the Old Bailey after a trial lasting eleven days.
 23–26 January – Much of Britain is struck with sub-zero temperatures and snowstorms. Schools and transport are disrupted.

February
 4 February – First two passenger train operating companies begin operation of their service franchises as part of the privatisation of British Rail: South West Trains (part of the Stagecoach Group) and Great Western Trains (management buyout).
 5 February – The first genetically modified food products go on sale in the UK.
 9 February
 The Provisional Irish Republican Army carry out the Docklands bombing in London, a truck bomb which kills two men (whose bodies are discovered the following day) and injures 39 people. This incident ends the 17-month ceasefire in Northern Ireland.
 The Parole Board announces that Moors Murderer Myra Hindley could soon be transferred to an open prison. Hindley, 53 and in her thirtieth year of imprisonment, is currently being held at Durham Prison, but if Home Secretary Michael Howard backs the Parole Board's recommendation, Hindley could soon be transferred to a prison with a more relaxed regime.
 13 February – Take That, the most successful British band of the 1990s, announce that they are splitting up.
 15 February – A report on the Arms-to-Iraq affair is critical of government ministers.
 18 February – An IRA bomb explodes on a bus in Central London, killing the transporter, Edward O'Brien, and injuring eight other people, including the driver.
 19–20 February – Approximately 1,000 passengers are trapped in the Channel Tunnel when two Eurostar trains break down due to electronic failures caused by snow and ice.
 22 February – Conservative MP Peter Thurnham announces his resignation from the House of Commons, reducing the Conservative Government's majority to just two seats. Resignations and by-election defeats have cost the Conservatives nineteen seats since the general election just under four years ago.
 28 February
 The Princess of Wales (Diana) agrees to give the Prince of Wales (now Charles III) a divorce, more than three years after separating.
 Sandra Gregory, a British teacher, is sentenced to 25 years in prison in Thailand for drug smuggling, three years after her arrest at Bangkok Airport. Her co-accused, Robert Lock, is cleared of the same charge and returns home.

March
 13 March – A gunman kills sixteen children, a teacher and himself in the Dunblane massacre. The killer is quickly identified as 43-year-old former scout leader Thomas Hamilton. It is the worst killing spree in the United Kingdom since the Hungerford massacre in 1987.
 20 March
 Home Secretary Michael Howard unveils plans to give courts the power to hand down heavier prison sentences, including sending burglars to prison for at least three years after a third offence and all drug dealers to prison for at least six years. The plans spark controversy, with some critics pointing out that it will increase the prison population by at least 20%.
 United Kingdom BSE outbreak: Secretary of State for Health Stephen Dorrell announces a link between the potentially-fatal variant Creutzfeldt–Jakob disease and the eating of beef infected with bovine spongiform encephalopathy.
 22 March – The European Union prohibits exports of British beef because of the BSE crisis.
 29 March – Three British soldiers are sentenced to life imprisonment in Cyprus for the abduction, attempted rape and manslaughter of Danish woman Louise Jensen. The three soldiers are Allan Ford from Birmingham, Justin Fowler from Falmouth and Jeffrey Pernell from Oldbury.

April
 1 April – The Local Government etc. (Scotland) and Local Government (Wales) Acts of 1994 come into effect, creating new unitary authorities.
 16 April – South East Staffordshire by-election: In a 22-point swing, Labour wins the Staffordshire South East seat from the Conservative Party at a by-election, cutting the Conservative Government's majority to just three seats almost exactly four years after they began the current term of Parliament with a 21-seat majority.
 17 April – The Duke and Duchess of York are divorced after ten years of marriage and four years after their separation.

May
 2 May
 The Conservatives lose 578 seats in local council elections, while Labour increases its total number of councillors nationally to almost 11,000.
 The Football Association announces that Glenn Hoddle, the current Chelsea manager, will succeed Terry Venables as manager of the England national football team after next month's European Championships, which England is hosting for the first time.
 5 May – Manchester United win the FA Premier League title for the third time in four seasons.
 11 May – Manchester United win the FA Cup for a record ninth time by beating Liverpool 1–0 and become the first team to win the double of the league title and FA Cup twice.
 17 May – Timothy Morss and Brett Tyler are found guilty of the murder of Daniel Handley, who disappeared near his London home in October 1994 and whose body was found near Bristol five months later. The Old Bailey trial judge sentences them to life imprisonment and recommends that neither of them is ever released.
 30 May
 the Duke and Duchess of York complete their divorce proceedings. The former Duchess loses the title HRH and becomes Sarah, Duchess of York.
 Sara Thornton, a Warwickshire woman who was jailed for life in 1990 for the murder of her abusive husband Malcolm the previous year, is released from prison after the Court of Appeal reduces her conviction to manslaughter.

June
 8 June – The European Football Championships begin in England, with the host nation drawing 1–1 with Switzerland in the opening game.
 13 June – The parliament of Guernsey, Channel Islands, votes to legalise abortion 86 years after it was outlawed.
 15 June – A bombing takes place in Manchester.
 16 June – Launch of The Planet on Sunday, a new Sunday tabloid focusing on environmental issues. Publication of the newspaper ceases after one edition because the owner is unhappy with its content.
 19 June – The government selects the Greenwich Peninsula site on the banks of the River Thames as the location for the Millennium Dome exhibition which is set to open for the year 2000.
 21 June – The latest MORI poll shows the Conservatives on 31%, their best showing for three years, but they are still 21 points behind Labour with just under a year to go before the next general election is due to be held.
 26 June – England's hopes of being European champions of football for the first time are ended with a penalty shootout defeat to Germany after a 1–1 draw in the semi-final.
 30 June – Germany wins the European Championship final with a 2–1 victory over the Czech Republic at Wembley.

July
 5 July – Dolly the sheep, the first mammal to have been successfully cloned from an adult cell, is born at the Roslin Institute.
 8 July – The Spice Girls' debut single Wannabe is released.
 12 July – South African President Nelson Mandela visits the UK.
 15 July – A Provisional Irish Republican Army unit plotting to disrupt the London electricity supply is arrested in Operation AIRLINES.
 18 July – Howard Hughes, 31, is found guilty of the murder of Sophie Hook in Llandudno, North Wales, twelve months ago. He is sentenced to life imprisonment at Chester Crown Court and the trial judge Mr Justice Curtis recommends that he is never released.
 19 July–9 August – Great Britain and Northern Ireland compete at the 1996 Summer Olympics in Atlanta, Georgia, United States, and win 1 Gold, 8 Silver and 6 Bronze medals. The only gold medal is won by Matthew Pinsent and Steve Redgrave in rowing (men's coxless pair).
 30 July – Alan Shearer becomes the most expensive footballer in the world in a £15,000,000 transfer from Blackburn Rovers to Newcastle United F.C.

August
 14 August – Unemployment has fallen to 2,126,200 – its lowest level since the summer of 1991.
 28 August – The Prince and Princess of Wales (Charles and Diana) complete their divorce proceedings after fifteen years of marriage. Their separation was first announced nearly four years ago. The former Princess of Wales loses her style of Royal Highness and assumes the style Diana, Princess of Wales.

September
 September
 Ford launches its new Ka city car, which makes use of a shortened Fiesta chassis. A revamped Mondeo goes on sale next month.
 Launch of the second generation Nissan Primera, built at Nissan's Sunderland factory.
 BBC Two shows the first episode of lifestyle reality television show Changing Rooms.
 5 September – Matthew Harding, vice-chairman of Chelsea FC, makes a £1,000,000 donation to the Labour Party – the largest donation made to the party by any individual.
 20 September – Jockey Willie Carson is injured by a horse at Newbury, Berkshire.

October
2 October –  Lawyer and politician John Taylor is made a Life Peer as Baron Taylor of Warwick, the first black Conservative peer.
 7 October – The Thiepval barracks bombing in Lisburn (Northern Ireland) injures many people, including a soldier who later dies from his injuries.
 12 October – The Conservative government's majority has dwindled to a single seat following the defection of Peter Thurnham to the Liberal Democrats.
 13 October 
 Racing driver Damon Hill wins the Japanese Grand Prix thus, clinching the Drivers' World Championship.
 The Queen opens Durham's new Riverside Ground in Chester-le-Street, the first new purpose-built first-class county cricket ground in the UK for over 100 years.
 16 October – The government announces plans to make possession of handguns illegal in the UK, following the Dunblane massacre.

November
 3 November – Barry Porter, Conservative MP for Wirral South, dies of cancer aged 57.
 8 November – With the next general election, no more than six months away, Labour still look set for a return to power after eighteen years in opposition, but the Conservatives have cut their lead to seventeen points in the latest MORI opinion poll – one of the narrowest gaps seen between the two leading parties in any opinion poll over the last three years.
 13 November – The Stone of Scone is taken away from King Edward's Chair in Westminster Abbey, its location since 1296, and returned to Scotland.
 18 November – Channel Tunnel fire – The Channel Tunnel is closed when a truck on a transporter wagon catches fire, disrupting Eurotunnel Shuttle and Eurostar services.
 24 November – BBC One airs The Simpsons for the first time with There's No Disgrace Like Home being the first episode.
 30 November – The Stone of Scone is installed in Edinburgh Castle 700 years after it was removed from Scotland by King Edward I of England.

December
 7 December – Sir John Gorst, 68-year-old Conservative MP for Hendon North in London, resigns the party whip, leaving the Conservative Party without a majority in the House of Commons.
 10 December
 James Mirrlees wins the Nobel Prize in Economics jointly with William Vickrey "for their fundamental contributions to the economic theory of incentives under asymmetric information".
 Harold Kroto wins the Nobel Prize in Chemistry jointly with Robert Curl and Richard Smalley "for their discovery of fullerenes".
 18 December – Unemployment has fallen below 2,000,000 for the first time in almost six years, four years since it peaked at nearly 3,000,000 during the recession. Despite the strong economic recovery and falling unemployment, the Conservatives are still trailing behind Labour in the opinion polls, a stark contrast to their performance at the last election, where they retained power despite Britain being in recession.

Undated
 Remaining provincial branches of the Bank of England, at Leeds, Newcastle, Manchester, Birmingham and Bristol, are closed.
 More than 4% of the UK population (some 2,500,000 people) now have internet access.
 New car sales in the United Kingdom are above 2,000,000 for this year, a level last seen in 1990.
 Panathlon Foundation is formed by  Ashley Iceton.

Publications
 Iain M. Banks's novel Excession.
 Seamus Deane's novel Reading in the Dark.
 Terry Pratchett's Discworld novels Feet of Clay and Hogfather; and his Johnny Maxwell novel Johnny and the Bomb.
 Graham Swift's novel Last Orders.
 Meera Syal's semi-autobiographical novel Anita and Me.

Births

January
 3 January – Florence Pugh, actress
 4 January – Jade Jones, athlete
 5 January – Maxim Baldry, English actor
 8 January – Hiram Boateng, footballer
 10 January – Lauren McCrostie, actress
 11 January – Charlie Coulson, footballer
 17 January – Kirsty Hickey, actor, singer and dancer
 21 January – Kyle Lander, footballer
 23 January – Ruben Loftus-Cheek, footballer
 26 January – Tyger Drew-Honey, actor
 29 January – Megan Jossa, actress

February
 1 February
 Josh Bates, motorcycle speedway rider
 Dionne Bromfield, singer-songwriter and television presenter
 7 February – Nathan Curtis, footballer
 14 February – Bethany Firth, swimmer
 20 February – Patrick Brough, footballer
 21 February – Sophie Turner, actress

March
 11 March – William Lenney, YouTuber 
 12 March – Byron Lawrence, footballer
 16 March – Ivan Toney, footballer
 17 March – Lydia Lloyd-Henry, actress
 19 March – Kaiya Jones, Scottish-born Australian actress
 20 March – Charley Hull, golfer
 21 March – Adam Ellis, French-born grasstrack and speedway rider
 22 March
 Jonathan Mason, actor
 Izzy Meikle-Small, actress
 31 March – Barney Gibson, cricketer

April
 3 April – Anna Jobarteh, actress
 5 April – Lowri Shone, ballerina
 8 April – Lorna Fitzgerald, actress
 11 April – Dele Alli, footballer
 12 April – Georgia Hall, golfer
 17 April – Lorna Fitzgerald, actress
 23 April – Charlie Rowe, actor
 25 April
 Bryn Morris, footballer
 Brad Walker, footballer

May
 3 May – Danielle Alakija, athlete
 15 May – Birdy, musician
 16 May – Jermaine Anderson, footballer

June
 1 June – Tom Holland, actor and dancer
 4 June – Ruby Harrold, gymnast
 11 June – Hakeeb Adelakun, footballer
 11 June - Harry Preece, The Captain
 23 June – Charlie Jones, actor
 24 June – Harris Dickinson, actor, writer, and director
 27 June – James Forde, actor
 28 June – William Miller, actor
 30 June – Gregor Ramsay, racing driver

July
 9 July – Scott McMann, footballer
 13 July – Ché Adams, footballer
 15 July – Mason Bennett, footballer
 16 July – Daniel Pearson, actor and presenter
 20 July – Martin James Bartlett, pianist
 24 July – Jordan McGhee, footballer
 26 July
 Olivia Breen, athlete
 CDawgVA, youtuber
 28 July
 Anya Chalotra, actress 
 Samuel Chatto, son of Lady Sarah Chatto and Daniel Chatto

August
 2 August – Robert Madge, actor
 5 August – Hannah Russell, paralympic swimmer
 9 August – Céline Buckens, Belgian-born actress
 20 August – Sophie Kamlish, paralympic
 22 August
 Jessica-Jane Applegate, swimmer
 Shannon Flynn, actress
 26 August – Tom Harwood, journalist

September
 2 September – Hannah Jones, snooker player
 17 September – Ella Purnell, actress
 20 September – Jerome Sinclair, footballer
 25 September
 Jake Pratt, actor
 John Souttar, footballer
 28 September – Aiden Moffat, racing driver

October
 4 October – Ella Balinska, actress
 7 October – Lewis Capaldi, Scottish singer-songwriter
 11 October – Hollie Doyle, flat racing jockey
 16 October – Sam Thornton, diver
 17 October – Princess Marie-Caroline of Liechtenstein
 19 October
 Daniel Goodfellow, diver
 Samuel Honywood, actor
 21 October – Alicia Blagg, diver
 25 October – Georgia Lock, actress and presenter
 26 October – Rebecca Tunney, gymnast
 31 October – Connor Wilkinson, actor

November
 11 November – Ryan Kent, footballer
 12 November – Alexander Ogilvy, son of James Ogilvy
 23 November – James Maddison, footballer
 24 November – Harry Lewis, youtuber
 28 November – Peter Moore, trombonist

December
 9 December – Deji Olatunji, youtuber and brother of KSI
 18 December – Devaanshi Mehta, started the Asian Donor Campaign (ADC) (died 2012)
 26 December – Cassius Taylor, son of Lady Helen Taylor

Full date unknown
 Maz Totterdell, singer and songwriter
 Nadia Whittome, Labour Member of Parliament

Deaths

 3 January – Terence Cuneo, artist (born 1907)
 6 January – John Philipps Kenyon, historian (born 1927)
 8 January – Norrie McCathie, footballer (born 1961)
 15 January – Richard Cobb, historian and professor (born 1917)
 16 January – Harry Potts, footballer and manager (born 1920)
 27 January – Barbara Skelton, socialite (born 1916)
 6 February 
 Renee Roberts, actress (born 1908)
 Patsy Smart, actress (born 1918)
 9 February – Sir George Trevelyan, 4th Baronet, educational pioneer (born 1906)
 11 February 
 Cyril Poole, cricketer (born 1921)
 Bob Shaw, Northern Irish science fiction writer (born 1931)
 14 February – Bob Paisley, footballer and manager (born 1919)
 16 February – Kenneth Robinson, politician (born 1911)
 27 February 
 Iain Murray, 10th Duke of Atholl, Scottish peer (born 1931)
 Pat Smythe, show jumper (born 1928)
 6 March 
 Simon Cadell, actor (born 1950)
 Douglas Jay, Baron Jay, politician (born 1907)
 8 March – Jack Churchill, British Army officer (born 1906 in Hong Kong)
 11 March – Sir Charles Oatley, physicist (born 1904)
 15 March – Helen Chadwick, sculptor (born 1953)
 18 March – Jacquetta Hawkes, prehistoric archaeologist (born 1910)
 25 March – John Snagge, radio personality (born 1904)
 4 April – Winifred Shotter, actress (born 1904)
 6 April – Greer Garson, actress (born 1904)
 8 April – Donald Adams, actor and opera singer (born 1928)
 13 April – George Mackay Brown, Scottish poet and dramatist (born 1921)
 18 April – Mike Leander, songwriter and record producer (born 1941)
 20 April – Christopher Robin Milne, author and bookseller (born 1920)
 23 April – P. L. Travers, novelist (Mary Poppins) (born 1899 in Australia)
 25 April – John Lorne Campbell, Scottish historian (born 1906)
 1 May – Eric Houghton, English footballer and manager (born 1910)
 2 May – Peter Swales, businessman and football chairman (born 1932)
 6 May – Wally Nightingale, guitarist (born 1956)
 7 May – Albert Meltzer, anarchist writer (born 1920)
 14 May – Vera Chapman, writer (born 1898)
 19 May – Margaret Rawlings, actress (born 1906)
 20 May – Jon Pertwee, actor (born 1919)
 23 May – Patrick Cargill, actor (born 1918)
 29 May – Jeremy Sinden, actor (born 1950)
 2 June – Leon Garfield, children's author (born 1921)
 3 June – Peter Glenville, actor and director (born 1913)
 7 June – Percy Edwards, animal impersonator (born 1908)
 15 June – Allenby Chilton, former footballer and football manager (born 1918)
 19 June – Vivian Ellis, composer and lyricist (born 1903)
 20 June – John Buchan, 2nd Baron Tweedsmuir, peer (born 1911)
 29 June – Pamela Mason, actress and screenwriter (born 1916)
 1 July – Alfred Marks, actor and comedian (born 1921)
 12 July – Walter Hassan, automotive engineer (born 1907)
 17 July
 Chas Chandler, musician and record producer (born 1938) 
 Sir Geoffrey Jellicoe, landscape architect (born 1900)
 21 July – Wolfe Morris, actor (born 1925)
 22 July – Rob Collins, musician (born 1963); died in a car accident
 4 August – Geoff Hamilton, television presenter (born 1936)
 6 August – Ossie Clark, fashion designer (born 1942; murdered)
 8 August – Sir Neville Francis Mott, physicist (born 1905)
 9 August – Sir Frank Whittle, RAF officer and inventor (born 1907)
 14 August – Albert Neuberger, biochemist (born 1908, German Empire)
 27 August – Abram Games, graphic designer (born 1914)
 29 August – Phyllis Pearsall, cartographer and creator of the A–Z (born 1906)
 3 September – Julian Amery, Baron Amery of Lustleigh, politician (born 1919)
 4 September – Joan Clarke, cryptanalyst and numismatist (born 1917)
 10 September – Plantagenet Somerset Fry, historian (born 1931; suicide)
 13 September – Jane Baxter, actress (born 1909)
 19 September – Douglas Hyde, journalist and writer (born 1911)
 23 September – Stuart Piggott, archaeologist (born 1910)
 24 September – Mark Frankel, actor (born 1962); accidentally killed
 26 September – Sir Geoffrey Wilkinson, chemist (born 1921)
 29 September – Leslie Crowther, comedian and TV presenter (born 1933)
 6 October – Winifred Drinkwater, aviator and aeroplane engineer (born 1913)
 9 October – Roy Lewis, writer and small press printer (born 1913)
 11 October – Terry Patchett, Labour Member of Parliament (born 1940)
 13 October – Beryl Reid, actress (born 1919)
 16 October – Eric Malpass, novelist (born 1910)
 22 October – Matthew Harding, businessman (born 1953)
 24 October – Gladwyn Jebb, diplomat and politician (born 1900)
 3 November – Barry Porter, Conservative Member of Parliament (born 1939)
 6 November – Tommy Lawton, footballer (born 1919)
 9 November – Roger Makins, 1st Baron Sherfield, diplomat (born 1904)
 10 November – Marjorie Proops, journalist (born 1911)
 16 November 
 Reginald Bevins, politician (born 1908)
 Jack Popplewell, playwright (born 1909)
 24 November – Sorley MacLean, Scottish Gaelic poet (born 1911)
 26 November – Michael Bentine, comedian and comic actor (born 1922)
 29 November – Denis Jenkinson, motorsports journalist (born 1920)
 9 December 
 Mary Leakey, archaeologist (born 1913)
 Ivor Roberts-Jones, sculptor (born 1913)
 11 December 
 Willie Rushton, comedian, actor and cartoonist (born 1937)
 W. G. G. Duncan Smith, World War II pilot (born 1914)
 15 December – Dave Kaye, pianist (born 1906)
 16 December – Quentin Bell, biographer and art historian (born 1910)
 17 December – Ruby Murray, Northern Irish singer (born 1925)
 18 December – Gwilym Hugh Lewis, World War I air ace (born 1897)
 23 December – Ronnie Scott, jazz musician and club owner (born 1927)

See also
 List of British films of 1996

References

 
United Kingdom
Years of the 20th century in the United Kingdom